Gansu (alternately romanized as Kansu) is a province in Northwest China. Its capital and largest city is Lanzhou, in the southeast part of the province.

The Yellow River passes through the southern part of the province. Part of Gansu's territory is located in the Gobi Desert. The Qilian mountains are located in the south of the Province.

Gansu has a population of 26 million, ranking 22nd in China. Its population is mostly Han, along with Hui, Dongxiang and Tibetan minorities. The most common language is Mandarin. Gansu is among the poorest administrative divisions in China, ranking 31st, last place, in GDP per capita as of 2019.

The State of Qin originated in what is now southeastern Gansu and went on to form the first known Empire in what is now China. The Northern Silk Road ran through the Hexi Corridor, which passes through Gansu, resulting in it being an important strategic outpost and communications link for the Chinese empire.

The city of Jiayuguan, the second most populated city in Gansu, is known for its section of the Great Wall and the Jiayuguan Pass fortress complex.

Name
Gansu is a compound of the names of Gānzhou (now the main urban district and seat of Zhangye) and Sùzhou (an old name and the modern seat of Jiuquan), formerly the two most important Chinese settlements in the Hexi Corridor.

Gansu is abbreviated as "" or "", and was also known as Longxi or Longyou prior to early Western Han dynasty, in reference to the Long Mountain (the modern day Liupan Mountain's southern section) between eastern Gansu and western Shaanxi. 

Until 1987, Gansu was rendered in the postal romanization and Wade-Giles as Kansu, which gradually replaced by pinyin starting in 1958. The spelling of the province is also spelled in Mandarin Phonetic Symbols II (1986) and Tongyong Pinyin (2002) adopted by the Government of the Republic of China (ROC) on Taiwan, who would later adopt Hanyu Pinyin in 2009.

History 

Gansu's name is a compound name first used during the Song dynasty. It is a combination of the names of two prefectures in the Sui and Tang dynasty: Gan (around Zhangye) and Su (around Jiuquan). Its eastern part forms part of one of the cradles of ancient Chinese civilisation.

Ancient Gansu 
In prehistoric times, Gansu was host to Neolithic cultures. The Dadiwan culture, from where archaeologically significant artifacts have been excavated, flourished in the eastern end of Gansu from about 6000BC to about 3000BC. The Majiayao culture and part of the Qijia culture took root in Gansu from 3100 BC to 2700 BC and 2400 BC to 1900 BC respectively.

The Yuezhi originally lived in the very western part of Gansu until they were forced to emigrate by the Xiongnu around 177 BCE.

The State of Qin, known in China as the founding state of the Chinese empire, grew out from the southeastern part of Gansu, specifically the Tianshui area. The Qin name is believed to have originated, in part, from the area. Qin tombs and artifacts have been excavated from Fangmatan near Tianshui, including one 2200-year-old map of Guixian County.

Imperial era
 
In imperial times, Gansu was an important strategic outpost and communications link for the Chinese empire, as the Hexi Corridor runs along the "neck" of the province. The Han dynasty extended the Great Wall across this corridor, building the strategic Yumenguan (Jade Gate Pass, near Dunhuang) and Yangguan fort towns along it. Remains of the wall and the towns can be found there. The Ming dynasty built the Jiayuguan outpost in Gansu. To the west of Yumenguan and the Qilian Mountains, at the northwestern end of the province, the Yuezhi, Wusun, and other nomadic tribes dwelt (Shiji 123), occasionally figuring in regional imperial Chinese geopolitics.

By the Qingshui treaty, concluded in 823 between the Tibetan Empire and the Tang dynasty, China lost much of western Gansu province for a significant period.

After the fall of the Uyghur Khaganate, a Buddhist Yugur (Uyghur) state called the Ganzhou Uyghur Kingdom was established by migrating Uyghurs from the khaganate in part of Gansu that lasted from 848 to 1036AD.

Along the Silk Road, Gansu was an economically important province, as well as a cultural transmission path. Temples and Buddhist grottoes such as those at Mogao Caves ('Caves of the Thousand Buddhas') and Maijishan Caves contain artistically and historically revealing murals. An early form of paper inscribed with Chinese characters and dating to about 8BC was discovered at the site of a Western Han garrison near the Yumen pass in August 2006.

The Xixia or Western Xia dynasty controlled much of Gansu as well as Ningxia.

The province was also the origin of the Dungan Revolt of 1862–77. Among the Qing forces were Muslim generals, including Ma Zhan'ao and Ma Anliang, who helped the Qing crush the rebel Muslims. The revolt had spread into Gansu from neighbouring Qinghai.

There was another Dungan revolt from 1895 to 1896.

Republican China
As a result of frequent earthquakes, droughts and famines, the economic progress of Gansu was significantly slower than that of other provinces of China until recently. Based on the area's abundant mineral resources it has begun developing into a vital industrial center. An earthquake in Gansu at 8.6 on the Richter scale killed around 180,000 people mostly in the present-day area of Ningxia in 1920, and another with a magnitude of 7.6 killed 275 in 1932.

The Muslim Conflict in Gansu (1927–1930) was a conflict against the Guominjun.

While the Muslim General Ma Hongbin was acting chairman of the province, Muslim General Ma Buqing was in virtual control of Gansu in 1940. Liangzhou District in Wuwei was previously his headquarters in Gansu, where he controlled 15 million Muslims. Xinjiang came under Kuomintang (Nationalist) control after their soldiers entered via Gansu. Gansu's Tienshui was the site of a Japanese-Chinese warplane fight.

Gansu was vulnerable to Soviet penetration via Xinjiang. Gansu was a passageway for Soviet war supplies for the Republic of China during the Second Sino-Japanese War. Lanzhou was a destination point via a road coming from Dihua (Ürümqi). The Gonxingdun Aerodrome was one of several air bases where the Chinese Air Force operated in defense of Gansu. Gansu provided wartime China with most of the locally sourced petrol from the Yumen Laojunmiao oil wells beginning in the summer of 1939, producing 250,000 tons of crude oil in those war years. Lanzhou and Lhasa were designated to be recipients of a new railway.

The Kuomintang Islamic insurgency in China (1950–1958) was a prolongation of the Chinese Civil War in several provinces including Gansu.

Geography 

It lies between the Tibetan Plateau and the Loess Plateau, bordering Mongolia (Govi-Altai Province) to the northwest, Inner Mongolia and Ningxia to the north, Shaanxi to the east, Sichuan to the south, and Xinjiang to the west. The Yellow River passes through the southern part of the province.

Part of the Gobi Desert is located in Gansu, as well as small parts of the Badain Jaran Desert and the Tengger Desert.

The Yellow River gets most of its water from Gansu, flowing straight through Lanzhou. The area around Wuwei is part of Shiyang River Basin.

The landscape in Gansu is very mountainous in the south and flat in the north.

It is bound from north by the Gobi Desert and Qilian Mountains from the south.

Gansu generally has a semi-arid to arid continental climate (Köppen BSk or BWk) with warm to hot summers and cold to very cold winters, although diurnal temperature ranges are often so large that maxima remain above  even in winter.

Administrative divisions 

Gansu is divided into fourteen prefecture-level divisions: twelve prefecture-level cities and two autonomous prefectures:

The fourteen Prefecture of Gansu are subdivided into 82 county-level divisions (17 districts, 4 county-level cities, 58 counties, and 3 autonomous counties).

Urban areas

Politics

Secretaries of the Chinese Communist Party (CCP) Gansu Committee: The Secretary of the CCP Gansu Committee is the highest-ranking office within Gansu Province.

Zhang Desheng: 1949–1954
Zhang Zhongliang: 1954–1961
Wang Feng: 1961–1966
Hu Jizong: 1966–1967
Xian Henghan: 1970–1977
Song Ping: 1977–1981
Feng Jixin: 1981–1983
Li Ziqi: 1983–1990
Gu Jinchi: 1990–1993
Yan Haiwang: 1993–1998
Sun Ying: 1998–2001
Song Zhaosu: 2001–2003
Su Rong: 2003–2007
Lu Hao: April 2007 − December 2011
Wang Sanyun: December 2011 − March 2017
Lin Duo: March 2017 − March 2021
Yin Hong: March 2021 − December 2022
Hu Changsheng: December 2022 - present

Governors of Gansu: The Governorship of Gansu is the second highest-ranking official within Gansu, behind the Secretary of the CPC Gansu Committee. The governor is responsible for all issues related to economics, personnel, political initiatives, the environment and the foreign affairs of the province. The Governor is appointed by the Gansu Provincial People's Congress, which is the province's legislative body.

Wang Shitai: 1949–1950
Deng Baoshan: 1950–1967
Xian Henghan: 1967–1977
Song Ping: 1977–1979
Feng Jixin: 1979–1981
Li Dengying: 1981–1983
Chen Guangyi: 1983–1986
Jia Zhijie: 1986–1993
Yan Haiwang: 1993
Zhang Wule: 1993–1996
Sun Ying: 1996–1998
Song Zhaosu: 1998–2001
Lu Hao: 2001–2006
Xu Shousheng: January 2007 – July 2010
Liu Weiping: July 2010 – April 2016
Lin Duo: April 2016 – April 2017
Tang Renjian: April 2017−December 2020
Ren Zhenhe: December 2020-present

Economy 
Despite recent growth in Gansu and the booming economy in the rest of China, Gansu is still considered to be one of the poorest provinces in China. For several years, it has ranked as one of the provinces with lowest GDP per capita. Its nominal GDP for 2017 was about 767.7 billion yuan (US$113.70 billion) and per capita of 29,326 RMB (US$4,343). The province also has a large difference in wealth between regions and urban versus rural areas. The poorest areas are Dingxi, Longnan, Gannan and Linxia. According to analysts, the local economy failed to gather momentum while other provinces did manage to increase their economic growth.

Agriculture 

Due to poor natural conditions such as aridness, Gansu is one of the Chinese provinces with smallest per  capita  area of arable  land. Agricultural production includes cotton, linseed oil, maize, melons (such as the honeydew melon, known locally as the Bailan melon, millet, and wheat. Gansu is known as a source for wild medicinal herbs which are used in Chinese medicine. However, pollution by heavy metals, such as cadmium in irrigation water, has resulted in the poisoning of many acres of agricultural land. The extent and nature of the heavy metal pollution is considered a state secret.

Industry 
The industrial sector in Gansu was developed after completion of the Longhai railway in 1953 and blueprinted in the first five-year plan of China. Until 2014, the industrial sector contributed the most to Gansu's economy. The most important industries are petrochemicals, non-ferrous metallurgy, machinery and electronics. The province is also an important base for wind and solar power. As a result of environmental protection policies, the industry sector is not growing. The manufacturing sector has been shrinking for several years and has low investment numbers.

According to some sources, the province is also a center of China's nuclear industry.

As stipulated in the country's 12th Five Year Plan, the local government of Gansu hopes to grow the province's GDP by 10% annually by focusing investments on five pillar industries: renewable energy, coal, chemicals, nonferrous metals, pharmaceuticals and services.

Mining 

A large part of Gansu's economy is based on mining and the extraction of minerals, especially rare earth elements.  The province has significant deposits of antimony, chromium, coal, cobalt, copper, fluorite, gypsum, iridium, iron, lead, limestone, mercury, mirabilite, nickel, crude oil, platinum, troilite, tungsten, and zinc among others.  The oil fields at Yumen and Changqing are considered significant.

Gansu has China's largest nickel deposits accounting for over 90% of China's total nickel reserves.

Services 

Since 2014, the service sector is the largest economic sector of Gansu. Tourism is a sector that is becoming of increased importance.

Economic and technological development zones
The following economic and technological zones are situated in Gansu:
Lanzhou National Economic and Technological Development Zone was established in 1993, located in the center of Lanzhou Anning District. Main industries include textile mills, rubber, fertilizer plants, oil refinery, petrochemical, machinery, and metallurgical industry.
It is expected to expand another . The zone mainly focuses on Biotechnology, chemical industry, building decoration materials and information technology.

Demographics 

Gansu province is home to a little less than 25 million people. 73% of the population was rural, but much relocation in recent years has reduced this. Gansu is 92% Han and also has Hui, Tibetan, Dongxiang, Tu, Uyghurs, Yugur, Bonan, Mongolian, Salar and Kazakh minorities. Gansu province's community of Chinese Hui Muslims was bolstered by Hui Muslims resettled from Shaanxi province during the Dungan Revolt. Gansu is also a historical home, along with Shaanxi, of the dialect of the Dungans, who migrated to Central Asia. The southwestern corner of Gansu is home to a large ethnic Tibetan population.  Modern Gansu is dominated by Lanzhou city and Linxia Hui prefectures, their growth hides the stark fact that much of the rest is rapidly losing population.

Languages 
Most of the inhabitants of Gansu speak dialects of Northern Mandarin Chinese. On the border areas of Gansu one might encounter Tu, Tibetan, Mongolian, Uyghur and the Kazakh language. Most of the minorities also speak Chinese.

Culture 

A unique variety of Chinese folk music popularly identified with the local peoples of Gansu include the "Hua'er" (flowery melodies), and is popular among the Han and nine ethnic groups of Gansu. The cuisine of Gansu is based on the staple crops grown there: wheat, barley, millet, beans, and sweet potatoes.  Within China, Gansu is known for its lamian (pulled noodles), and Muslim restaurants which feature authentic Gansu cuisine.

Religion

According to a 2012 survey around 12% of the population of Gansu belongs to organised religions, the largest groups being Buddhists with 8.2%, followed by Muslims with 3.4%, Protestants with 0.4% and Catholics with 0.1%. Around 88% of the population may be either irreligious or involved in Chinese folk religion, Buddhism, Confucianism, Taoism, and folk religious sects.

Muslim restaurants are common, and feature typical Chinese dishes, but without any pork products, and instead an emphasis on lamb and mutton. Gansu has many works of Buddhist art, including the Maijishan Grottoes. Dunhuang was a major centre of Buddhism in the Middle Ages.

Tourism

Jiayuguan Pass of the Great Wall

Jiayuguan Pass, in Jiayuguan city, is the largest and most intact pass, or entrance, of the Great Wall. Jiayuguan Pass was built in the early Ming dynasty, somewhere around the year 1372. It was built near an oasis that was then on the extreme western edge of China. Jiayuguan Pass was the first pass on the west end of the great wall so it earned the name "The First And Greatest Pass Under Heaven".

An extra brick is said to rest on a ledge over one of the gates.  One legend holds that the official in charge asked the designer to calculate how many bricks would be used. The designer gave him the number and when the project was finished, only one brick was left. It was put on the top of the pass as a symbol of commemoration.  Another account holds that the building project was assigned to a military manager and an architect.  The architect presented the manager with a requisition for the total number of bricks that he would need.  When the manager found out that the architect had not asked for any extra bricks, he demanded that the architect make some provision for unforeseen circumstances.  The architect, taking this as an insult to his planning ability, added a single extra brick to the request.  When the gate was finished, the single extra brick was, in fact, extra and was left on the ledge over the gate.

Mogao Grottoes

The Mogao Grottoes near Dunhuang have a collection of Buddhist art. Originally there were a thousand grottoes, but now only 492 cave temples remain. Each temple has a large statue of a buddha or bodhisattva and paintings of religious scenes. In 336 AD, a monk named Le Zun (Lo-tsun) came near Echoing Sand Mountain, when he had a vision. He started to carve the first grotto. During the Five Dynasties period they ran out of room on the cliff and could not build any more grottoes.

Silk Road and Dunhuang City

The historic Silk Road starts in Chang'an (present-day Xi'an) and goes to Constantinople (Istanbul). On the way merchants would go to Dunhuang in Gansu. In Dunhuang they would get fresh camels, food and guards for the journey around the dangerous Taklamakan Desert. Before departing Dunhuang they would pray to the Mogao Grottoes for a safe journey, if they came back alive they would thank the gods at the grottoes. Across the desert they would form a train of camels to protect themselves from thieving bandits. The next stop, Kashi (Kashgar), was a welcome sight to the merchants. At Kashi most would trade and go back and the ones who stayed would eat fruit and trade their Bactrian camels for single humped ones. After Kashi they would keep going until they reached their next destination.

Activities includes camel and 4x4 rides.

Silk Route Museum

The Silk Route Museum is located in Jiuquan along the Silk Road, a trading route connecting Rome to China, used by Marco Polo. It is also built over the tomb of the Western Liang King.

Bingling Temple

Bingling Temple, or Bingling Grottoes, is a Buddhist cave complex in a canyon along the Yellow River. Begun in 420 AD during the Jin dynasty, the site contains dozens of caves and caverns filled with outstanding examples of carvings, sculpture, and frescoes. The great Maitreya Buddha is more than 27 meters tall and is similar in style to the great Buddhas that once lined the cliffs of Bamiyan, Afghanistan. Access to the site is by boat from Yongjing in the summer or fall. There is no other access point.

Labrang Monastery

Labrang Tashikyil Monastery is located in Xiahe County, Gannan Tibetan Autonomous Prefecture, located in the southern part of Gansu, and part of the traditional Tibetan province of Amdo. It is one of the six major monasteries of the Gelukpa tradition of Tibetan Buddhism in Tibet, and the most important one in Amdo. Built in 1710, it is headed by the Jamyang-zhaypa. It has 6 dratsang (colleges), and houses over sixty thousand religious texts and other works of literature as well as other cultural artifacts.

Maijishan Grottoes 

The Maijishan Grottoes are a series of 194 caves cut in the side of the hill of Majishan in Tianshui. This example of rock cut architecture contains over 7,200 Buddhist sculptures and over 1,000 square meters of murals. Construction began in the Later Qin era (384–417 CE).

Education
Gansu province is home to the only class A Double First Class University in China's northwest, Lanzhou University.

Colleges and universities 

Lanzhou University, Lanzhou
Northwest Normal University, Lanzhou
Lanzhou University of Technology, Lanzhou
Lanzhou Jiaotong University, Lanzhou
Northwest University of Nationalities, Lanzhou
Gansu Agricultural University, Lanzhou
Lanzhou City University, Lanzhou
Gansu Political Science and Law Institute, Lanzhou
Gansu University of Technology
Lanzhou Commercial College
Lanzhou Polytechnic College
Hexi University, Zhangye
Northwest Minority University
Tianshui Normal College (Tianshui)
Longdong College (Qingyang)

Natural resources

Land
 grassland
 mountain slopes suitable for livestock breeding
 forests (standing timber reserves of )
 cultivated land ( per capita)
 wasteland suitable for forestation
 wasteland suitable for farming

Minerals
Three thousand deposits of 145 different minerals. Ninety-four minerals have been found and ascertained, including nickel, cobalt, platinum, selenium, casting clay, finishing serpentine, whose reserves are the largest in China. Gansu has advantages in getting nickel, zinc, cobalt, platinum, iridium, copper, barite, and baudisserite.

Energy
Among Gansu's most important sources of energy are its water resources: the Yellow River and other inland river drainage basins. Gansu is placed ninth among China's provinces in annual hydropower potential and water discharge. Gansu produces 17.24 gigawatts of hydropower a year. Twenty-nine hydropower stations have been constructed in Gansu, altogether(?) capable of generating 30 gigawatts. Gansu has an estimated coal reserve of 8.92 billion tons and petroleum reserve of 700 million tons.

There is also good potential for wind and solar power development. The Gansu Wind Farm project – already producing 7.965GW in 2015 – is expected to achieve 20GW by 2020, at which time it will likely become the world's biggest collective windfarm.

In November 2017 an agreement between the Chinese Academy of Sciences and Gansu government was announced, to site and begin operations of a molten salt reactor pilot project in the province by 2020.

Flora and fauna
Gansu has 659 species of wild animals. It has twenty-four rare animals which are under a state protection.

Gansu's mammals include some of the world's most charismatic: the giant panda, golden monkeys, lynx, snow leopards, sika deer, musk deer, and the Bactrian camel.

Among zoologists who study moles, the Gansu mole is of great interest.  For a reason that can only be speculated, it is taxologically a New World mole living among Old World moles: that is to say, an American mole living in a sea of Euro-Asians.

Gansu is home to 441 species of birds; it is a center of endemism and home to many species and subspecies which occur nowhere else in the world.

Gansu is China's second-largest producer of medicinal plants and herbs, including some produced nowhere else, such as the hairy asiabell root, fritillary bulb, and Chinese caterpillar fungus.

Environment

Natural disasters 

On 16 December 1920, Gansu witnessed the deadliest landslide ever recorded. A series of landslides, triggered by a single earthquake, accounted for most of the 180,000 people killed in the event.

Anti-desertification project 
The Asian Development Bank is working with the State Forestry Administration of China on the Silk Road Ecosystem Restoration Project, designed to prevent degradation and desertification in Gansu. It is estimated to cost up to US$150 million.

Space launch center 
The Jiuquan Satellite Launch Center, located in the Gobi desert, is named after the city of Jiuquan, Gansu, the nearest city, although the center itself is in the Inner Mongolia Autonomous Region.

See also 
 Huangyangchuan
 List of Major National Historical and Cultural Sites in Gansu
 List of prisons in Gansu
 Silk Road transmission of Buddhism

References

External links 

 Gansu Government official website 
 

 
Provinces of the People's Republic of China
Inner Asia
Western China
1666 establishments in China